Lisa Wallbutton (born 14 January 1986 in Henderson, New Zealand) is a basketball player for New Zealand.

She won Outstanding Young Player in the 2004 and 2005 seasons, and MVP at the 2005 NZ U23 tournament. She debuted for the Tall Ferns (New Zealand women's basketball team) in 2005 at the William Jones Cup in Taiwan.

At the 2006 Commonwealth Games she won a silver medal as part of the Tall Ferns.

Wallbutton has also represented New Zealand at the 2008 Beijing Olympics. “My fondest memory of my time with the Tall Ferns will always be competing at the Beijing Olympics. For me that was a childhood dream come true and an opportunity to compete at the highest level against the very best players in the world at the time.”

In 2010 she played for the Albury Wodonga Bandits in the SEABL (South East Australian Basketball League) in the ABA.

Wallbutton, still a prominent player in the Western Australian State League with the Perth Redbacks.

References

1986 births
Living people
Basketball players at the 2006 Commonwealth Games
Basketball players at the 2008 Summer Olympics
Commonwealth Games medallists in basketball
Commonwealth Games silver medallists for New Zealand
New Zealand expatriate basketball people in Australia
New Zealand women's basketball players
Olympic basketball players of New Zealand
People educated at Westlake Girls High School
Sportspeople from the Auckland Region
Medallists at the 2006 Commonwealth Games